Travolto dagli affetti familiari (Swept Away by Family Affection) is a 1978 Italian comedy film directed by Mauro Severino.

Plot 
Memé Di Costanzo decides to seduce the dr. Isotta Uccelli, owner of a pharmacy, in order to assure an economic stability to his old grandmother Nana and his dog Piccolo.

Cast 
 Lando Buzzanca as Memé Di Costanzo
 Andréa Ferréol as Isotta 
 Gloria Guida as  Eliana 
 Nerina Montagnani as Nana
 Franca Dominici as Isotta's Mother
 Nais Lago as Isotta's Aunt

See also         
 List of Italian films of 1978

References

External links

1978 films
1978 comedy films
1970s Italian-language films
Commedia all'italiana
1970s Italian films